Mirzapur Union is a union of Gopalpur Upazila, Tangail District, Bangladesh.

Demographics
According to the 2011 Bangladesh census, Mirzapur Union had 7,103 households and a population of 27,359. The literacy rate (age 7 and over) was 42.8% (male: 44.6%, female: 41.2%).

See also
 Union Councils of Tangail District

References

Populated places in Tangail District
Unions of Gopalpur Upazila